In statistics, iterated conditional modes is a deterministic algorithm for obtaining a configuration of a local maximum of the joint probability of a Markov random field. It does this by iteratively maximizing the probability of each variable conditioned on the rest.

See also 
 Belief propagation
 Graph cuts in computer vision
 Optimization problem

References

Optimization algorithms and methods
Computational statistics